Hong Kong Golden may refer to:

 Hong Kong Golden FC, a football team now known as Xiangxue Sun Hei.
 Hong Kong Golden Forum an internet forum about computing.